Chum Phuang is a district in the eastern part of Nakhon Ratchasima province, northeastern Thailand.

History
Chum Phuang district was separated from Phimai district. It was made a minor district (king amphoe) in 1956 and upgraded to a full district in 1959.

Geography
Neighbouring districts are (from the north clockwise): Prathai, Mueang Yang and Lam Thamenchai of Nakhon Ratchasima Province; Lam Plai Mat of Buriram province; and Huai Thalaeng and Phimai of Nakhon Ratchasima.

The district is the site of the Huay Bong Reservoir. The 25 million cubic metre capacity reservoir supplies water for the 800 households of Prasuk Subdistrict.

Administration
The district is divided into nine sub-districts (tambons). Chum Phuang is the only township (thesaban tambon) of the district, covering parts of the tambon Chum Phuang. There are a further nine tambon administrative organizations (TAO).

Missing numbers are tambons which now form the districts Mueang Yang and Lam Thamenchai.

References

Chum Phuang